Flushing High School is a four-year public high school in Flushing, in the New York City borough of Queens. The school is operated by the New York City Department of Education.

As of the 2020-21 school year, the school had an enrollment of 1,414 students and 92.67 classroom teachers (on an FTE basis), for a student–teacher ratio of 15.26:1. There were 1,173 students (83.0% of enrollment) eligible for free lunch and 64 (4.53% of students) eligible for reduced-cost lunch.

History

Flushing High School was established by the Village of Flushing in 1875 prior to its consolidation with New York City and remains the oldest public high school in the present city.  For decades, the school enjoyed a good reputation with local real estate sales brochures touting proximity to "famed Flushing High School" as late as the 1960s. By the 1980s, the student body ceased to be drawn from the local Jewish and Asian population. As of the 2010s, the school remained generally low-performing. In an attempt to improve conditions, the entire staff had to reapply for their positions in 2017. Since then, graduation rates have increased from 63% in 2017 to 83% in 2021. 

Flushing High School was originally located on the northeast corner of Union Street and Sanford Avenue.  It is currently located on Northern Boulevard, and housed in a distinctive Collegiate Gothic style building featuring turrets and gargoyles. It was built from 1912 to 1915, with another wing added in 1954. The WPA's Federal Art Project funded James Penney  to paint four murals which were installed in 1938.

The building was designated as a landmark by the New York City Landmarks Preservation Commission in 1991. It was listed on the National Register of Historic Places in 1992.

Notable alumni

 Dave Barbour (1912–1965), musician who played with Artie Shaw and Benny Goodman
 Jay Bromley (born 1992), defensive tackle who plays in the XFL for the DC Defenders and formerly played in the NFL for the New York Giants
 Jerry Bock (1928–2010), musical theater composer who was co-author of the Broadway musical Fiddler On The Roof
 Lynn Burke (born 1943), Olympic gold medalist in swimming
 Calvin O. Butts (1949 -2022, class of 1967), Pastor of the Abyssinian Baptist Church in Harlem and President of FHS Senior Class of 1967
 Godfrey Cambridge (1933–1976), African-American actor and comedian
 Robert Christgau (born 1942), music critic for The Village Voice
 Michael Costa (born c. 1948), American football coach who was head coach of the St. Augustine's Falcons football team from 2002 to 2014.
 Eddie Fogler (born 1948), University of North Carolina Tar Heels basketball star and former college basketball coach
 Nancy Gertner (born 1946), former United States District Judge of the United States District Court for the District of Massachusetts.
 Harry Kondoleon (1955–1994), playwright, Obie award-winner
 Lenny Lipton (born 1940), songwriter who was co-author of Peter, Paul & Mary's classic hit "Puff, the Magic Dragon".
 George Maharis (born 1928), actor best known for his role on the TV show Route 66.
 Paul Meltsner (1905–1966), WPA-era artist

 Nicholas A. Miller born (1987), Nicholas A. Miller is a New York Real Estate Broker, entrepreneur, business consultant, and investor. Miller is the founder and owner of BYBTax.com, PaperlessPrograms.co, N.Miller Realty, and NewYorkStateNotary.com , which are all companies that are under his B.Y.B. Capital umbrella. Miller graduated from Flushing High School in 2005.

 Joshua Prager, physician who specializes in pain medicine
 Harold Rosenbaum (born 1950), musician, conductor, founder of The New York Virtuoso Singers.
 Vincent Sardi Jr. (1915–2007), restaurateur
 Andy Shernoff (born 1955), songwriter and rock musician
 George Spitz (1912–1986), Olympic high jumper
 Webster Tarpley (born 1946, class of 1962), historian and political commentator
 Mary van Kleeck (1883–1972), social feminist active as a proponent of scientific management and a planned economy.
 Dave Von Ohlen (born 1958), former Major League Baseball relief pitcher for the St. Louis Cardinals and the Oakland Athletics
 Lawrence Walsh (1912–2014), Deputy Attorney General in Eisenhower Administration and Iran-Contra special prosecutor, 1986-1993
 Peter Zaremba, member of the band The Fleshtones.

References

External links

Flushing High School website
Flushing High School alumni website

Public high schools in Queens, New York
Educational institutions established in 1875
School buildings on the National Register of Historic Places in New York City
New York City Designated Landmarks in Queens, New York
Flushing, Queens
National Register of Historic Places in Queens, New York
1875 establishments in New York (state)